United States debt-ceiling crisis may refer to:
 2023 United States debt-ceiling crisis
 2013 United States debt-ceiling crisis
 2011 United States debt-ceiling crisis
 1995–1996 United States federal government shutdowns, which included a dispute about the debt ceiling

Debt-ceiling crises